Mung bean sprouts are a culinary vegetable grown by sprouting mung beans. They can be grown by placing and watering the sprouted beans in the shade until the hypocotyls grow long. Mung bean sprouts are extensively cultivated and consumed in East and Southeast Asia and are very easy to grow, requiring minimal care other than a steady supply of water. They are often used in school science projects.

Cultivation 
A variety of techniques are used for sprouting mung beans. A common technique for home growers is sprouting the beans in a jar, with a fine mesh or muslin cloth tied over the top with a rubber band or string. Fresh water is then poured into the jar three to four times a day; the jars are then upturned and left to drain. The precise growing technique to use depends on the amount that one wants to collect. The main principles are: selecting good seed (new and uniform), ensuring that light reaches the seeds, and also ensuring they receive enough humidity while avoiding waterlogging.

Culinary use 

Mung bean sprouts can be microwaved or stir fried. They may also be used as an ingredient, e.g., for spring rolls.

China 
In Chinese cuisine, common dishes that may use mung bean sprouts, known as dòuyá, are fried rice, spring rolls, egg drop soup, and hot and sour soup. 

In Cantonese cuisine, bean sprouts are used dishes such as egg fu yung and beef chow fun.

India
In Indian cuisine, especially in Maharashtrian cuisine, Usal is a spicy dish that balances the heat of curry with either mung beans or sprouts.

Japan 
In Japanese cuisine, moyashi ("bean sprout") in a strict sense refers to the mung bean sprout. They are a common ingredient in many Japanese dishes such as stir-fries and soups.

Korea 
In Korean cuisine, sukjunamul refers to both the mung bean sprouts themselves and the namul (seasoned vegetable dish) made from mung bean sprouts. Mung bean sprouts are not as common an ingredient as soybean sprouts in Korean cuisine, but they are used in bibimbap, in the fillings of dumplings and in sundae (Korean sausage).

The name sukjunamul is a compound of Sukju and namul, of which the former derived from the name of Sin Sukju (1417–1475), one of the prominent Joseon scholars. Sin Sukju betrayed his colleagues and favoured the King's uncle as a claimant to the throne. People regarded Sin Sukju's move as unethical and immoral, and so gave his name to mung bean sprouts, which tend to go bad and spoil very easily.

Nepal 
In Nepalese cuisine, kwati, a soup of nine types of sprouted beans, is especially prepared in a festival of Janai Purnima which normally falls in the month of August. Kwati is prepared by frying and mixing onion, garlic, ginger, potatoes, spices and bean sprouts, including mung bean sprouts. A lot of variation exists from house to house but is basically about making the kwati. It is considered to be a nutritious food in Nepal. Kwati is normally eaten with rice. Sometimes meat (esp. fried goat) is also added to spice up the kwati.

Thailand 
In Thai cuisine, mung bean sprouts are usually eaten in soups and stir-fried dishes. In pad thai they are often added to the pan for one quick stir before serving and in soups such as nam ngiao they are sprinkled on top of the dish.

Indonesia 
Mung bean sprouts are used widely in Indonesian Cuisine. Mung bean sprouts usually accompany soup dishes such as rawon, mie celor, or soto; mixed in Indonesian vegetable salads such as pecel, karedok, or gado-gado; and stir fried like in tauge goreng

Vietnam

See also 
 Bean sprout
 Soybean sprout

References 

Asian vegetables
Chinese cuisine
Japanese cuisine
Korean cuisine
Indian cuisine
Nepalese cuisine
Thai cuisine
Indonesian cuisine
Vietnamese cuisine
Japanese vegetables
Korean vegetables
Namul
Sprouting